The Royal Palace of Capodimonte is a large palazzo in Naples, Italy. It was formerly the summer residence and hunting lodge of the Bourbon kings of the Two Sicilies, one of the two royal palaces in Naples. Today, it comprises the National Museum of Capodimonte and the Royal Forest. The palace was constructed on its somewhat cooler hilltop location (Capodimonte means "top of the hill") just outside the city, with urban Naples ultimately expanding around it.

History
In 1738, King Charles VII of Naples and Sicily (later Charles III, king of Spain) decided to build a hunting lodge on the Capodimonte hill. He then decided that he would instead build a grand palace (a Royal Palace, as in Italian Reggia means Royal), partly because his existing residence, the Palace of Portici, was too small to accommodate his court, and partly because he needed somewhere to house the fabulous Farnese art collection which he had inherited from his mother, Elisabetta Farnese, last descendant of the sovereign ducal family of Parma.

He commissioned Angelo Carasale, Giovanni Antonio Medrano and Antonio Canevari to build it. Work started in August 1738, but it was to take more than a century to complete, partly because of the difficulty of transporting piperno, the volcanic rock used, from the quarries in Pianura. Since all surviving drawings bear Medrano’s signature, most scholars give him complete credit. Moreover, the façade bears little in common with Canevari’s oeuvre. Its sober articulation adheres more closely to Herreran monuments in Spain and the output of the military engineer Medrano. Architectural borrowing was never neutral, and at Capodimonte such features harmonized the palace with other royal buildings, thus casting it as a member of a close-knit family of crown structures. The features drawn from Spain, the Teatro di San Carlo, and the Palazzo Reale would seem to indicate that Medrano oversaw the design. He knew Spanish monuments well, renovated the Palazzo Reale, and built the theater. Medrano probably designed the stairs, for their distinctive C-shaped lights resemble the one he designed for San Carlo. 

In 1758, the first part of the palace was opened and the art collection was brought in. In 1759, Ferdinand I succeeded his father Charles and the following year he appointed the architect Ferdinando Fuga to oversee work on the palace and the grounds. In 1787, on the advice of Jacob Philipp Hackert, a laboratory for the restoration of paintings was created.

When the Parthenopaean Republic was declared in 1799, Ferdinand fled to Palermo on board Nelson's Vanguard, taking the most valuable items from the palace with him. What remained was looted by the French troops of General Championnet who were billeted there. During the 10 years of French occupation (1806-1815), the palace was the residence of Joseph Bonaparte and then of Joachim Murat. The art collection was transferred to the Naples National Archaeological Museum. When Ferdinand returned from Sicily in 1815, he employed many painters and sculptors to work on the decoration of the palace.

Francesco I succeeded his father Ferdinand in 1825 and appointed the architect Antonio Niccolini to oversee work on the palace. Niccolini added monumental staircases, and new suites of rooms for the royal family, continuing work when Ferdinand II succeeded Francesco I in 1830. The palace was finally completed in 1840, and a gallery housing contemporary art was added.

With Italian Unification, the royal palace passed in 1861 to the House of Savoy who used it as a residence and also added to the art collections, appointing Domenico Morelli as consultant for new acquisitions. They also added an extensive collection of historic firearms and other weapons. In 1866, the boudoir of Maria Amalia of Saxony was transferred to Capodimonte from the Palace of Portici, and in 1877 a Roman era marble floor was brought in from a Roman villa on Capri.

In the early 20th century, the palace became the residence of the Dukes of Aosta. Then in 1920 it became the property of the Italian state. In 1950 it became a museum with many of the exhibits being returned from the National Museum.

Interior 
The first and second floors house the National Gallery (Galleria Nazionale).

Elsewhere in the palace the royal apartments are furnished with antique 18th century furniture and a collection of porcelain and majolica from the various royal residences. The famous Capodimonte Porcelain Factory was just adjacent to the palace; it was started in 1743 by the Bourbon King Charles.

Gardens 
The palace is situated in the Bosco di Capodimonte ('Hilltop Wood'), now a park, which served as a royal hunting preserve.

See also 
 List of Baroque residences

References

External links 

  

 
Capodimonte
Royal residences in the Kingdom of Naples
Houses completed in 1742
Baroque palaces in Italy
Italian Baroque gardens
Neoclassical palaces
Neoclassical architecture in Naples
Baroque architecture in Naples
1742 establishments in Italy
1742 establishments in the Kingdom of Naples
18th century in Naples
Joachim Murat